Norman Quindt (born 2 November 1996) is a German footballer who plays as a goalkeeper.

Career
Quindt made his professional debut for TSV Havelse in the 3. Liga on 24 July 2021 against 1. FC Saarbrücken.

References

External links
 
 
 
 

1996 births
Living people
People from Hamelin
Footballers from Lower Saxony
German footballers
Association football goalkeepers
SV Rödinghausen players
TSG Neustrelitz players
Sportfreunde Lotte players
FSV Union Fürstenwalde players
TSV Havelse players
3. Liga players
Regionalliga players